"Ho! Summer" is a single by Tackey & Tsubasa.

"Ho! Summer" is Tackey & Tsubasa's seventh single under the Avex Trax label, and is their first single to be dedicated to summer. The regular version of the CD came with a bonus track, the limited version came with a special key ring, and the CD+DVD version came with a DVD with choreography for the song "Ho! Summer". The main track was used as the theme song for the drama "Gakincho: Return Kids" from July 31, 2006 to September 29, 2006. The Tsubasa solo song, "Mihatenu Yume", was used as the House Commodity "Dongari Corn" commercial song. The limited edition song, "Michi", was used as the image song for "Kawai Juku".

Sample of the translated lyrics:
Love is surfing, to the summer color Yeah! Yeah!
The season of being barefoot, let the light shine on you!
Love surfing, someone definitely call me darling, please!
The sun's shower
Please, please, me Yeah!

Track listing

Regular CD Format - Jacket C
 "" (Hitoshi Haneda) - 4:06
 "Taste me" (Takizawa Hideaki) (Ayumi Miyazaki) - 3:42
 "  (Faraway Dream)" (Imai Tsubasa) (Hideyuki Obata) - 4:33
 "  (Road)" (Kinuko Sakuma) - 4:54
 "Ho! サマー: karaoke" (Hitoshi Haneda) - 4:07

Limited CD format - Jacket B
 "" (Hitoshi Haneda) - 4:06
 "Taste me" (Takizawa Hideaki) (Ayumi Miyazaki) - 3:42
 "  (Faraway Dream)" (Imai Tsubasa) (Hideyuki Obata) - 4:34
 "Ho! サマー: karaoke" (Hitoshi Haneda) - 4:05

CD+DVD format - Jacket A

CD portion
 "" (Hitoshi Haneda) - 4:06
 "Taste me" (Takizawa Hideaki) (Ayumi Miyazaki) - 3:42
 "  (Faraway Dream)" (Imai Tsubasa) (Hideyuki Obata) - 4:34
 "Ho! サマー: karaoke" (Hitoshi Haneda) - 4:05

DVD portion
 "Ho! サマー (Choreography Video)"

Personnel
 Takizawa Hideaki - vocals
 Imai Tsubasa - vocals

TV performances
 August 4, 2006 - Music Fighter
 August 7, 2006 - Hey! Hey! Hey!
 August 10, 2006 - Utaban
 August 11, 2006 - Music Station

Charts
Oricon Sales Chart (Japan)

RIAJ certification
As of September 2006, "Ho! Summer" has been certified "gold" for shipments of over 100,000 by the Recording Industry Association of Japan.

References 
 
 

2006 singles
Tackey & Tsubasa songs
Japanese television drama theme songs
2006 songs